Marvin Earl Holmes Jr. (born November 27, 1948) is an American politician. He is a member of the Maryland House of Delegates, representing District 23B in Prince George's County, Maryland.

Early life and career
Holmes was born in Cleveland, Ohio on November 28, 1948. He graduated from Max S. Hayes Vocational School and later attended Tuskegee University, concentrating in engineering. Holmes served in the U.S. Coast Guard from 1970 until 1974 where he earned a Commendation Medal and the National Defense Service Medal. He was a member of the presidential honor guard and a search and rescue air crewman. Outside of politics, Holmes is a real estate agent and has been in the field for over 25 years.

In the legislature
Holmes was sworn into the Maryland House of Delegates on January 8, 2003.

Committee assignments
 Vice-Chair, Rules and Executive Nominations Committee, 2020–present
 Member, Environment and Transportation Committee, 2015–present (natural resources, agriculture & open space subcommittee, 2015–2018; land use & ethics subcommittee, 2015–present; chair, housing & real property subcommittee, 2015–present)
 Member, Joint Committee on Administrative, Executive and Legislative Review, 2015–present
 Member, Environmental Matters Committee, 2003–2015 (local government & bi-county agencies subcommittee, 2003–2006, 2011–2015; motor vehicles & transportation subcommittee, 2003–2006; housing & real property subcommittee, 2003–2010; affordable housing work group, 2004; motor vehicle issues work group, 2004; land use & ethics subcommittee, 2006–2015; ground rent work group, 2007; co-chair, housing for individuals with disabilities work group, 2004; chair, natural resources subcommittee, 2007–2015)
 Deputy Majority Whip, 2006–2010
 Member, Joint Legislative Work Group to Study State, County and Municipal Fiscal Relationships, 2009–2010
 Vice-Chair, House Emergency Medical Services Work Group, 2009–2012
 Member, Business Climate Work Group, 2013–2014
 House Chair, Joint Committee on Legislative Ethics, 2015–2017

Other memberships
 2nd Vice-Chair, Prince George's County Delegation, 2003–2010 (vice-chair, 2017; law enforcement & state-appointed boards committee, 2008, 2015–2016; washington suburban sanitary commission committee, 2008–2012; vice-chair, bi-county committee, 2018–present, member, 2003–2007, 2013–2014)
 Member, Legislative Black Caucus of Maryland, 2003–present (historian, 2011–2012)
 Member, Maryland Green Caucus, 2003–present
 Member, Maryland Veterans Caucus, 2005–present
 Chair, Democratic Party Caucus, 2011–2015
 Member, National Conference of State Legislatures (legislative effectiveness & state government committee, 2005–2007; legislative effectiveness committee, 2007–present)

Political positions

National politics
Following the 2021 United States Capitol attack, Holmes compared Donald Trump to Adolf Hitler, stating "What's going on, unfortunately, is the start of anarchy proposed and accelerated by Trump. We only need to look at how Hitler came into power by chipping away at a society by having others enacting his dominance. It's similar to how slavery became law; one statute at a time by those that have power, in an attempt to increase the powerlessness of those that they wish to dominate."

Social issues
In 2012, Holmes voted against legislation to expand gambling in Maryland; the bill passed the House of Delegates by a vote of 71-58 and was signed into law on August 15, 2012.

Holmes introduced legislation during the 2019 legislative session to lower the state's lead exposure threshold from 10 to 5 micrograms per deciliter, the Centers for Disease Control and Prevention's reference level that demonstrates elevated lead levels in children. The bill passed and was signed into law by Governor Larry Hogan on April 30, 2019.

Taxes
In 2012, Holmes voted for legislation to raise the state's fuel tax to replenish the state's transportation fund.

Electoral history

References

Democratic Party members of the Maryland House of Delegates
African-American state legislators in Maryland
Politicians from Cleveland
1948 births
Living people
People from Upper Marlboro, Maryland
21st-century American politicians
21st-century African-American politicians
20th-century African-American people